These are the official results of the Men's Shot Put event at the 1995 IAAF World Championships in Gothenburg, Sweden. There were a total number of 32 participating athletes, with the final held on Wednesday August 9, 1995. The qualification mark was set at 19.80 metres.

Medalists

Schedule
All times are Central European Time (UTC+1)

Abbreviations
All results shown are in metres

Records

Qualification
 Held on Tuesday 1995-08-08

Final

See also
 1995 Shot Put Year Ranking

References
 Results
 IAAF

s
Shot put at the World Athletics Championships